This article displays the qualifying draw for the women's singles tournament at the 2014 Australian Open. The draw was made on 8 January 2014.

Seeds 

 Sharon Fichman (first round)
 Coco Vandeweghe (first round)
 Johanna Konta (second round)
 Anna-Lena Friedsam (first round)
 Katarzyna Piter (qualified)
 Maryna Zanevska (first round)
 Heather Watson (qualified)
 Magda Linette (second round)
 Kristýna Plíšková (second round)
 Vera Dushevina (qualifying competition)
 Shelby Rogers (second round)
 Anna Tatishvili (qualified)
 Claire Feuerstein (qualifying competition)
 Irina-Camelia Begu (qualified)
 Alexandra Panova (second round)
 Sofia Arvidsson (first round)
 Andrea Hlaváčková (second round)
 Mathilde Johansson (second round)
 Marta Sirotkina (qualifying competition)
 Maria João Koehler (first round)
 Olga Puchkova (first round)
 Sesil Karatantcheva (first round)
 Irina Falconi (qualifying competition; Lucky loser) An-Sophie Mestach (second round)''

Qualifiers

Lucky loser 
  Irina Falconi

Qualifying draw

First qualifier

Second qualifier

Third qualifier

Fourth qualifier

Fifth qualifier

Sixth qualifier

Seventh qualifier

Eighth qualifier

Ninth qualifier

Tenth qualifier

Eleventh qualifier

Twelfth qualifier

References

External links 
 Qualifying draw
 2014 Australian Open – Women's draws and results at the International Tennis Federation

Women's Singles Qualifying
Australian Open (tennis) by year – Qualifying